The 2009 Yokohama mayoral election was held on August 30, 2009. Fumiko Hayashi, backed by the  Democratic Party, won the election.

Results

Sources 
 Results from JanJan

Yokohama
2009 elections in Japan
Mayoral elections in Japan
August 2009 events in Japan
2000s in Yokohama